Ogyen Choeling Monastery is a Buddhist monastery in Bhutan.

Buddhist monasteries in Bhutan
Nyingma monasteries and temples